Paul Farrant (1935 – 17 April 1960) was a British slalom canoeist who competed in the mid-to-late 1950s. He won a gold medal in the folding K-1 event at the 1959 ICF Canoe Slalom World Championships in Geneva.

Farrant worked as a carpenter. Between 1957 and 1960, he was chairman of the Chalfont Park Canoe Club, of which he was a founder member.

Farrant died at Westminster Hospital on 17 April 1960, a day after he was injured in a road accident.

References

1935 births
1960 deaths
British male canoeists
Medalists at the ICF Canoe Slalom World Championships